Dillingham Construction was an engineering and construction services company which was  based in Hawaii then in Pleasanton, California. The company was founded in the 1880s as the Oahu Railway and Land Company to build a railroad across the swamps of Oahu, Hawaii. Dillingham later became a leading engineering and construction firm, building dams, airfields, high-rises, hotels and embassies around the world.

Notable projects
 One Embarcadero Center
 Grand Hyatt San Francisco
 44 Montgomery
 50 California Street
 BC Place
 US Embassy, Singapore
 US Embassy, Moscow
 Sakkara Air Base
 Izmir Motorway Project
 Hilton Hawaiian Village
 Tahoe Keys, California
 Ala Moana Shopping Center
 Los Angeles Emergency Operations Center

References
Yardley, Paul T. "Millstones and Milestones: The Career of B. F. Dillingham" (1981, University of Hawaii Press).

External links 

Companies based in Pleasanton, California
American companies established in 1880
Construction and civil engineering companies of the United States
1880 establishments in Hawaii
Construction and civil engineering companies established in 1880
2003 disestablishments in California
Companies disestablished in 2003
Companies that filed for Chapter 11 bankruptcy in 2003